Martina Anderson (born 16 April 1962) is an Irish former politician from Northern Ireland who served as Member of the Legislative Assembly (MLA) for Foyle from 2020 to 2021, and previously from 2007 to 2012. A member of Sinn Féin, she served as a Member of the European Parliament (MEP) representing Northern Ireland from 2012 to 2020.

She became involved in the Irish republican movement in the late 1970s and is a former Provisional Irish Republican Army (IRA) volunteer. In June 1986, she was convicted of conspiring to cause explosions and sentenced to life in prison. She was released 13 years later as a condition of the Good Friday Agreement and subsequently became involved in politics for Sinn Féin.

She was a Member of the Legislative Assembly of Northern Ireland from 2007 to 2012, representing Foyle. She served in the Northern Ireland Executive as a Junior Minister at the Office of the First Minister and deputy First Minister from 2011 to 2012. In 2012, she became a Member of the European Parliament, and she was reelected in 2014 and in 2019. She left the European Parliament in 2020 and returned to the Northern Ireland Assembly.

Early life
Anderson was born in the Bogside in Derry, Northern Ireland, into a well-known Irish republican family. Her father was a Protestant. She has six sisters and three brothers, one of whom, Peter, is a former Sinn Féin councillor, and her niece is former Irish Senator and former Foyle MP Elisha McCallion. She was educated at St Cecilia's College between 1973 and 1980.

IRA activity
Anderson was arrested aged 18 leaving a furniture store in Derry and charged with possession of a firearm and causing an explosion. She was released on bail after spending two months in Armagh Women's Prison and fled across the border to Buncrana in County Donegal.

Anderson was again arrested on 24 June 1985 at a flat in Glasgow with four other IRA members including Brighton bomber Patrick Magee. On 11 June 1986, all five were convicted of conspiring to cause explosions in England, although Magee was the only person convicted in relation to the Brighton hotel bombing.

In 1989, Anderson married fellow prisoner and IRA member Paul Kavanagh at Full Sutton Prison. By 1993, she was one of just two female category A prisoners in England, the other being fellow republican Ella O'Dwyer. While at Durham Prison, Anderson obtained a first-class honours degree in social science from the Open University. In 1994, she was transferred from Durham to Maghaberry Prison in Northern Ireland. On 10 November 1998, Anderson was released under the terms of the Good Friday Agreement.

Political career
In 2007, Anderson was elected to the Northern Ireland Assembly as a Sinn Féin member for Foyle, along with Raymond McCartney.

In May 2007, Anderson became one of the first Sinn Féin members to join the Northern Ireland Policing Board.

In December 2007, Anderson said she was concerned that large numbers of migrant workers from mainly Catholic countries were being classed as 'Catholic/nationalist' in monitoring forms, rather than 'other'. She said "Given that the entire basis of the legislation around monitoring was put in place to identify imbalances in the workforce between the local Catholic/nationalist and Protestant/unionist communities it is therefore vital that given the addition of migrant workers in the workforce, that they should clearly be categorised as having a community background of 'other'."
Employment monitoring by the Equality Commission records solely religion, and not political affiliation.

She was selected by Sinn Féin to fight the Foyle constituency at the 2010 Westminster general election. She lost to the SDLP incumbent, Mark Durkan, by 5,000 votes (11% of the vote). In May 2012 it was announced that she would be replacing Bairbre de Brún, as MEP for Northern Ireland. Anderson retained her MEP seat in the 2014 election, topping the poll with 159,813 first-preference votes.

In May 2016, she criticised the presence of Israeli lobbyists in the European Parliament: "We can give you a list of all the things we attempted to do, the Israelis are all over this place like a rash." The remarks led to criticism and condemnation, and the European Jewish Congress called on Martin Schulz, president of the European Parliament, to discipline her. Anderson said she meant the word "rash" as a metaphor.

In the 2019 European Parliament elections, Anderson was returned on the fifth ballot, after Diane Dodds of the Democratic Unionist Party and Naomi Long of Alliance. After her seat was abolished due to Brexit, on 10 February 2020 she became an MLA for Foyle for a second time, after being selected by Sinn Féin to replace Raymond McCartney.

On 4 May 2021, Anderson announced she would not be contesting the 2022 Northern Ireland Assembly election, following an internal party review of recent election results in Foyle. She resigned from the Assembly with Karen Mullan in September and was replaced by Pádraig Delargy and Ciara Ferguson. Anderson's sister, Sharon Burke, claimed that Anderson had been used as a "sacrificial lamb" by Sinn Féin. "The British could not do to our Martina what her comrades and friends have done," Burke wrote on Facebook.

References

External links
 Official Sinn Féin biography
 Martina Anderson on European Parliament website

 

1962 births
20th-century women from Northern Ireland
21st-century women politicians from Northern Ireland
Female members of the Northern Ireland Assembly
Irish republicans
Irish republicans imprisoned under Prevention of Terrorism Acts
Junior ministers of the Northern Ireland Assembly (since 1999)
Living people
MEPs for Northern Ireland 2009–2014
MEPs for Northern Ireland 2014–2019
MEPs for Northern Ireland 2019–2020
Northern Ireland MLAs 2007–2011
Northern Ireland MLAs 2011–2016
Politicians from Derry (city)
Prisoners sentenced to life imprisonment by England and Wales
Provisional Irish Republican Army members
Sinn Féin MEPs
Sinn Féin MLAs
21st-century women MEPs for Northern Ireland
Women ministers of the Northern Ireland Executive
Alumni of the Open University
Sinn Féin parliamentary candidates